is a passenger railway station located in the city of Naruto, Tokushima Prefecture, Japan. It is operated by JR Shikoku and has the station number "N06".

Lines
Only local services stop at the station.

Layout
The station, which is unstaffed, consists of a side platform serving a single track. There is no station building, only a shelter on the platform. A ramp leads up to the platform from the access road.

History
After the Awa Railway was nationalized on 1 July 1933, Japanese Government Railways (JGR) took over control of the station. It was upgraded and renamed as Kyōkaimae Station and operated it as part of the Awa Line. On 20 March 1935, after some other stations on the line were absorbed into the Kōtoku Main Line, Kyōkaimae became part of the Muya Line. On 1 March 1956, the line was renamed the Naruto Line. On 1 April 1987, with the privatization of Japanese National Railways (JNR), the successor of JGR, the station came under the control of JR Shikoku.

Passenger statistics
In fiscal 2019, the station was used by an average of 72 passengers daily

Surrounding area
 Tenrikyō cathedral
Japan National Route 11

See also
 List of Railway Stations in Japan

References

External links

 JR Shikoku timetable

Railway stations in Tokushima Prefecture
Railway stations in Japan opened in 1924
Naruto, Tokushima